Vincent "Vinny" Rutherford (born January 14, 1969) is an American television producer. He is best known as the executive producer of Attack of the Show! on the G4 network (2008–2012).

See also
History of television

External links

American television producers
Living people
1969 births
Place of birth missing (living people)
21st-century American people